Double Springs is a town in Winston County, Alabama, United States. The city is the county seat of Winston County. The county seat was initially located at Houston, but by referendum in 1883, Double Springs prevailed and it was removed to there. It was incorporated on May 17, 1943. At the 2010 census the population was 1,083, up from 1,003 in 2000.

Geography 
Double Springs is located at  (34.151642, -87.404390).

Climate
According to the Köppen climate classification, Double Springs has a humid subtropical climate (abbreviated Cfa).

Demographics

2000 census
At the 2000 census there were 1,003 people, 426 households, and 276 families in the town. The racial makeup of the town was 97.51% White, 0.30% Black or African American, 0.60% Native American, 0.60% from other races, and 1.00% from two or more races. 1.10% of the population were Hispanic or Latino of any race.
Of the 426 households 30.3% had children under the age of 18 living with them, 48.6% were married couples living together, 12.7% had a female householder with no husband present, and 35.0% were non-families. 33.6% of households were one person and 16.9% were one person aged 65 or older. The average household size was 2.18 and the average family size was 2.75.

The age distribution was 21.3% under the age of 18, 8.9% from 18 to 24, 28.3% from 25 to 44, 22.9% from 45 to 64, and 18.5% 65 or older. The median age was 39 years. For every 100 females, there were 93.6 males. For every 100 females age 18 and over, there were 95.8 males.

The median household income was $25,865 and the median family income  was $29,615. Males had a median income of $25,667 versus $20,625 for females. The per capita income for the town was $15,122. About 16.8% of families and 20.3% of the population were below the poverty line, including 29.5% of those under age 18 and 28.2% of those age 65 or over.

2010 census
At the 2010 census there were 1,083 people, 412 households, and 260 families in the town. The racial makeup of the town was 97.3% White, 0.6% Black or African American, 0.8% Native American, 0.1% from other races, and 0.9% from two or more races. 0.4% of the population were Hispanic or Latino of any race.
Of the 412 households 27.2% had children under the age of 18 living with them, 43.4% were married couples living together, 15.5% had a female householder with no husband present, and 36.9% were non-families. 35.0% of households were one person and 16.5% were one person aged 65 or older. The average household size was 2.21 and the average family size was 2.82.

The age distribution was 20.1% under the age of 18, 7.5% from 18 to 24, 22.2% from 25 to 44, 26.2% from 45 to 64, and 24.0% 65 or older. The median age was 45.2 years. For every 100 females, there were 83.9 males. For every 100 females age 18 and over, there were 89.1 males.

The median household income was $30,865 and the median family income  was $32,232. Males had a median income of $27,450 versus $21,641 for females. The per capita income for the town was $13,973. About 21.1% of families and 25.6% of the population were below the poverty line, including 38.7% of those under age 18 and 11.3% of those age 65 or over.

2020 census

As of the 2020 United States census, there were 1,119 people, 564 households, and 380 families residing in the town.

Travel and entertainment 
Double Springs rests inside the William B. Bankhead National Forest, and is near Lewis Smith Lake. The Kinlock Shelter is located near Double Springs.

In 1944, a memorial marker was erected on the courthouse square "To the memory of the Denson Brothers – Seaborn M. Denson (1854-1936) and Thomas J. Denson (1863-1935) who devoted their lives and gifts to composing and teaching American religious folk music as embodied in the Sacred Harp, in most of the Southern States, but mostly in Alabama. This stone is placed in the midst of their field of labor by the loving hands of their families, pupils of their singing schools, and legions of singers and friends in the summer of the year 1944. The One Hundredth Anniversary of the Sacred Harp while 'Uncle Seab' and 'Uncle Tom' sing on – 'way over in the promised land'."

In 1987, the "Dual Destiny" statue was erected in front of the courthouse. This statue of a soldier, half confederate and half yankee, represents Winston County's dual affiliation during the American Civil War in which soldiers from within the county fought for both the Union and Confederate armies.

Even though Winston County had soldiers on both sides, the county itself refused to secede from the union with the rest of Alabama. This movement became known as the Republic of Winston and remains a local legend to this day.

Education 
The main offices of the Winston County School System are located in Double Springs. The chief school in Double Springs is Winston County High School, home of the Yellow Jackets. Winston Career Academy is also located in Double Springs.

References

External links 

 Double Springs is covered by the Northwest Alabamian Newspaper.

Towns in Alabama
Towns in Winston County, Alabama
County seats in Alabama